Vanessa Quin (born 15 October 1976) is a world champion BMX and downhill rider from New Zealand.

Quin competed in BMX events as a child, and moved into downhill mountain biking while at university. She was sponsored by Dirt magazine and raced internationally for about ten years. In 2002 Quin broke her neck while competing at the New Zealand national event, but made a full recovery and returned to racing. Quin represented New Zealand at 12 world championship events, including the 2004 event, when she won the elite women's section. She was the first New Zealander to win a world elite championship in downhill mountain bike. She was nominated as a finalist for the Halberg Award for Sportswoman of the Year 2004.

In 2008 Quin retired from the sport to have children, and returned in 2013. She entered and won the New Zealand national BMX event, and also entered and won the 30 years and over women's section at the BMX World Championships held in Auckland the same year.

References

Living people
1976 births
BMX riders
Downhill mountain bikers
New Zealand female cyclists
New Zealand mountain bikers